Events from the year 1595 in the Kingdom of Scotland.

Incumbents
Monarch – James VI

Births

Sir Alexander Falconer, 1st Lord Falconer of Halkerton

Deaths
15 September – John MacMorran, Baillie of Edinburgh, killed by rioting schoolchildren
3 October – John Maitland, 1st Lord Maitland of Thirlestane
Mary Sutherland, wife of King Caudle of Cawdor

See also
 Timeline of Scottish history

References